The 2010 NZIHL season was the sixth season of the New Zealand Ice Hockey League, the top level of ice hockey in New Zealand. Five teams participated in the league, and the Botany Swarm won the championship by defeating the West Auckland Admirals in the final.

Regular season

Final 
 Botany Swarm – West Auckland Admirals 3:1

External links 
 New Zealand Ice Hockey League official site

Seasons in New Zealand ice hockey
New Zealand Ice Hockey League seasons
Ice
New